Echt fett is an Austrian hidden camera television series. As in Just for Laughs: Gags and Trigger Happy TV, it shows clips of how unsuspecting subjects are brought into unusual situations by actors while being filmed with a hidden camera. A typical clip is filmed on the streets, or in a shopping mall. The comedic situations produced by the actors and the reactions of the unknowingly fooled are to entertain viewers. It was broadcast between 2003 and 2007.

See also
List of Austrian television series

External links
 

Hidden camera television series
Austrian television series
2003 Austrian television series debuts
2007 Austrian television series endings
2000s Austrian television series
ORF (broadcaster)
German-language television shows